The 1983 Lagos State gubernatorial election occurred on 13 August 1983. UPN candidate Lateef Jakande won the election.

Results
Lateef Jakande representing UPN won the election. The election held on 13 August 1983.

References 

Lagos State gubernatorial elections
Lagos State gubernatorial election
Lagos State gubernatorial election